Noémie Marin (born April 5, 1984 in Acton Vale, Quebec) is a former two-sport athlete that played ice hockey and softball. She was a four-time Clarkson Cup winner and she retired as the CWHL's all-time leading goalscorer.

Softball
In softball, Marin was the only player from Quebec to qualify for the 2008 Olympic softball roster. She played in three Canadian softball championships with the Québec Rebelles. In 2001 and 2002, she won the Canadian championships MVP award. Marin was part of the silver medal-winning squad at the 2007 Pan-American games in Rio de Janeiro. At the 2008 Beijing Olympics, Marin was part of the team that finished in fourth place. She was honoured with the Claudette Bergeron Trophy for Female Athlete of the Year in 2000 and 2001.

Playing Hockey career

NCAA
Noémie Marin played hockey at the University of Minnesota Duluth on a scholarship, leading the team in points in 2006–2007. She received WCHA All-Rookie honours, was named to the inaugural group of WCHA Scholar-Athletes, and was twice named a top-10 finalist for the Patty Kazmaier Memorial Award.  Marin set the team record for fastest two goals and shorthanded goals (0:27).

CWHL
Marin made her debut in 2008–09 with the Montreal Stars. Midway through the year, she set a CWHL single-game record by scoring 10 points (five goals and five assists) in a 12–3 win over the Ottawa Senators (January 3, 2009). She finished the year with 49 points (fourth overall in the Angela James Bowl scoring race) and was named to the CWHL All-Rookie Team. In 2009–2010, she scored 25 goals and was named a CWHL Second Team All-Star. In 2010-11 season, she finish 4th leading scorers, despite having been out of action with an injury for several weeks( missing 10 games due to an injury). In the championship game of the 2011 Clarkson Cup, Marin scored a goal.

Against the Brampton Thunder on December 13, 2015, Marin scored the 200th point in her CWHL career. Of note, Marin recorded an assist on a first period goal for Montreal scored by Karell Emard.

Hockey Canada
She is a former member of the Canadian U22 hockey team. In March 2011, she was invited to the Canadian national women's ice hockey team selection camp to determine the final roster for the 2011 IIHF Women's World Championships, from April 2 to 5 2011 at the Toronto MasterCard Centre

Coaching career
Noemie Marin was named head coach of Canada's National Women's Development Team for the 2016–17 season. Currently, she serves as the women's hockey head coach at John Abbott College. In addition, she served as an assistant coach with the Canadian National Women's Under-18 Team that competed at the 2015 IIHF U18 Women's World Championship and with Team Quebec at the 2015 National Women's Under-18 Championship.

Career stats

CWHL

Hockey Canada

Awards and honours

Softball
2007 Pan American Games, silver 
Played in three Canadian championships with the Quebec Rebelles
Canadian championships MVP, 2001 and 2002
Claudette Bergeron Trophy for Female Athlete of the Year, 2000 and 2001

Ice hockey
2004 WCHA All-Rookie honours
2004-05 second team All-WCHA
2005-06 WCHA All-Academic Team
2005-06 second team All-WCHA
Frozen Four Skills Challenge, Winner, 2007 Fastest Skater
Frozen Four Skills Challenge, Winner, 2007 Hardest Shot (76.7 mph)
Top-10 finalist for 2006 Patty Kazmaier Award
Top-10 finalist for 2007 Patty Kazmaier Award
USCHO.com Offensive Player of the Week (Week of January 12, 2004)
USCHO.com Offensive Player of the Week (Week of November 29, 2005
CWHL Player of the Month Award (March 2015)

References

1984 births
Living people
Canadian expatriate ice hockey players in the United States
Canadian softball players
Canadian women's ice hockey forwards
Clarkson Cup champions
French Quebecers
Les Canadiennes de Montreal players
Minnesota Duluth Bulldogs women's ice hockey players
Olympic softball players of Canada
People from Montérégie
Softball players at the 2007 Pan American Games
Softball players at the 2008 Summer Olympics
Ice hockey people from Montreal
Pan American Games competitors for Canada
Sportspeople from Montreal
21st-century Canadian women